Jacky Samson (April 11, 1943 in Paris – October 3, 2012) was a French jazz double-bassist.

Career
Samson studied bass in Versailles. He was the bassist in Georges Arvanitas's trio for nearly thirty years starting in 1965, playing with Dexter Gordon, Hank Mobley, and Albert Nicholas, among others. Outside of this association, he also performed or recorded in the 1960s and 1970s with François Biensan, Milt Buckner, Jimmy Dawkins, Maynard Ferguson, François Guin, Slide Hampton, Michel Hausser, Guy Lafitte, and Jean-Claude Naude. Later in his career, he became a professor in Orly.

Death 
He died on October 3, 2012 in Précy-sous-Thil, Côte-d'Or, France.

References

Michel Laplace, "Jacky Samson". The New Grove Dictionary of Jazz. 2nd edition, ed. Barry Kernfeld.

French jazz double-bassists
Male double-bassists
Musicians from Paris
French male jazz musicians
1943 births
Living people